FC Shevardeni-1906 Tbilisi is one of the oldest Georgian association football clubs. They play in the Liga 3, the third tier of Georgian football from 2023.

History
It was founded in 1906, after a Czech public figure named Jaroslav Svatoš invited several athletics coaches to Georgia at the end of the 19th century and formed a sports society called Sokol (Czech word for Falcon that was later translated to Georgian Shevardeni). The club played its first match on October 23, 1911, against the united team of different sports societies and won the game 1-0. During Soviet times, up until 1986, the club played in regional tournaments and in 1987 was promoted to the Vtoraya Liga (third division) of Soviet championship. In 1990, after the restoration of Georgia's independence, Shevardeni changed its name to Shevardeni 1906 and played in Umaglesi Liga until 1996, having finished as runners-up in the 1992–93 season. later it merged with Universiteti Tbilisi of Pirveli Liga to form TSU Tbilisi. Recently the club was re-established as Shevardeni 1906 and its new representatives have vowed to bring the team back to the top Georgian division. The club started to play in regional league in 2015 and within less than 3 years was promoted to Erovnuli Liga 2, which is the second tier of Georgian professional football league.

In May 2022 Based on decision made by GFF Disciplinary Committee, Dinamo Zugdidi and Shevardeni-1906 were accused of match-fixing and expelled from the league with immediate effect on 22 May. For this reason all their team or individual records have been annulled from the statistics of Erovnuli Liga 2 for the season 2022. A final verdict from the Disputes Resolution Tribunal is pending.

Current squad 
As of 10 July 2022

Honours
Georgian Umaglesi Liga
  Runner-up: 1992–93
Georgian Soviet Championship
  Winner: 1986 
Georgian Soviet Cup
  Winner: 1988

References

External links
Official Site 

Shevardeni-1906 Tbilisi
Shevardeni-1906 Tbilisi
1906 establishments in the Russian Empire
Association football clubs established in 1906
1900s establishments in Georgia (country)